Liu Xiaodong (born January 14, 1989) is a Chinese football midfielder who currently plays for Guangxi Pingguo Haliao in the China League Two.

Club career
A native of Changchun, Jilin, Liu Xiaodong began his football career when he joined the Changchun Yatai youth team where he eventually graduated to the senior team at the start of the 2008 Chinese Super League season. He  started his professional football career when he made his debut against Wuhan Guanggu on April 27, 2008 in a 1-0 win (though this score was changed to 3-0 because of Wuhan's withdrawal from the league) and his appearance was to make him the first native Changchun player to actually play for Changchun Yatai. He later  scored his first senior club goal against Shenzhen on June 25, 2008 in a 2-1 win. Throughout the season he was  mostly used as substitute to gain playing time and eventually made sixteen league appearances.

In March 2016, Liu was loaned to China League Two side Baoding Yingli Yitong until 31 December 2016. He made a permanent transfer to Baoding Yingli Yitong in February 2017.

On 28 February 2018, Liu transferred to Liaoning F.C.

International career
Liu Xiaodong was called up to the senior Chinese squad to take part in a friendly against Honduras on March 29, 2011 and went on to make his debut when he came on as a late substitute for Hao Junmin in a 3-0 victory.

Career statistics 
.

References

External links
Player stats at sohu.com
 
 

1989 births
Living people
Footballers from Changchun
Chinese footballers
Changchun Yatai F.C. players
Baoding Yingli Yitong players
Liaoning F.C. players
Chinese Super League players
China League One players
Association football forwards
Association football midfielders
China international footballers